Martim Malheiro Fabião Maia (born 24 May 1998) is a Portuguese professional footballer who plays for Trofense on loan from Santa Clara as a midfielder.

Football career
He made his Taça da Liga debut for Casa Pia on 28 July 2019 in a game against Vilafranquense.

On 7 August 2020, Maia signed a two-year contract with Polish club Zagłębie Sosnowiec.

Career statistics

References

External links

1998 births
People from Maia, Portugal
Sportspeople from Porto District
Living people
Portuguese footballers
Association football midfielders
Casa Pia A.C. players
Zagłębie Sosnowiec players
Amora F.C. players
C.D. Santa Clara players
C.D. Trofense players
Liga Portugal 2 players
I liga players
Portuguese expatriate footballers
Expatriate footballers in Poland
Portuguese expatriate sportspeople in Poland